Frank Challoner (July 6, 1853 – January 11, 1899) was an American businessman and politician who served as a member of the Wisconsin State Assembly.

Biography 
Born in Omro, Wisconsin, Challoner attended the University of Wisconsin and lived in California for two years. Challoner was the owner of Frank Challoner & Company in Oshkosh, Wisconsin. Challoner served as president of the Omro Village Board and was a Republican. Challoner served in the Wisconsin State Assembly from 1885 to 1889.

Challoner served on the University of Wisconsin–Madison board of regents at the time of his death. Challoner died in Oshkosh, Wisconsin.

Notes

1853 births
1899 deaths
People from Omro, Wisconsin
University of Wisconsin–Madison alumni
Businesspeople from Wisconsin
Mayors of places in Wisconsin
Republican Party members of the Wisconsin State Assembly
19th-century American politicians
19th-century American businesspeople